Manathoor Devasia Valsamma (born 21 October 1960) is a retired Indian athlete. She was the second Indian woman to win an individual gold medal at the Asian Games and the first to win it on Indian soil.

Early life
Valsamma was born on 21 October 1960 in Ottathai, Kannur district of Kerala. She started her athletics career during school days though she only took it more seriously when she moved to Mercy College, Palakkad, for further studies. Her first medal was for Kerala in the 100 metres hurdles and pentathlon in the Inter-University Championship at Pune in 1979.

She was enrolled in Southern Railway (India) and was coached by A. K. Kutty. She created a great impression at the Inter-State Meet at Bangalore in 1981 by winning five gold medals, the hurdles over 100 and 400 metres in addition to the 400 metres flat and the 400 m and 100 m relays. That performance catapulted her into the Railway and national teams and in 1982 she became the national champion over 400-metre hurdles with a new record, which was also better than the Asian record.

Professional athletics career
Valsamma won the gold medal in the 400 m hurdles in an Indian and Asian record time of 58.47 seconds in front of a home crowd at the Jawaharlal Nehru Stadium in the 1982 Asian Games. This made her the second woman athlete to win an Asian Games gold for India, after Kamaljit Sandhu (400 metres-1974). She later figured in a silver medal-winning 4 X 400 metres relay team. Govt. of India conferred her the Arjuna Award in 1982 and the Padma Shri in 1983 and the G. V. Raja cash award from Kerala Government.

For the first time in the history, the Indian women team entered the finals in the Los Angeles Olympics, 1984 and finished in the seventh position. Valsamma began concentrating more on 100 m hurdles. She won a gold in the 100 m hurdles and created a National record in the first National Games in 1985.

Valsamma also appeared in the Spartakiad 1983 in Moscow, the South Asian Federation (SAF) Games in Islamabad fetched her bronze in the 100 metres, a Silver in the quarter-mile and the Gold m the 4 x 400 metres relay.

In a career spanning nearly 15 years, M.D. Valsamma took part in World Cup meets in Havana, Tokyo, London, the Asian Games editions of 1982, 86, 90 and 94 and in all the Asian Track & Field meets and SAF Games, leaving her mark in each and every competition.

References

 Ministry of Youth Affairs and Sports Portal

External links
 
 

Living people
1960 births
Sportswomen from Kerala
Indian female sprinters
Indian female hurdlers
20th-century Indian women
20th-century Indian people
Olympic athletes of India
Athletes (track and field) at the 1984 Summer Olympics
Asian Games gold medalists for India
Asian Games silver medalists for India
Asian Games medalists in athletics (track and field)
Athletes (track and field) at the 1982 Asian Games
Athletes (track and field) at the 1986 Asian Games
Recipients of the Arjuna Award
Recipients of the Padma Shri in sports
Malayali people
People from Kannur district
Medalists at the 1982 Asian Games
Medalists at the 1986 Asian Games
Athletes from Kerala
South Asian Games gold medalists for India
South Asian Games silver medalists for India
South Asian Games bronze medalists for India
South Asian Games medalists in athletics